The Pushkar Singh Dhami ministry is the current Cabinet of Uttarakhand headed by the Chief Minister of Uttarakhand, Pushkar Singh Dhami.

Council of Ministers 

|}

References

Dhami I
Pushkar I
Cabinets established in 2021
2021 establishments in Uttarakhand